Krystyna Maria Szumilas (born 28 June 1956 in Knurów) is a Polish politician. She was elected to the Sejm on 25 September 2005 getting 16,105 votes in 29 Gliwice district as a candidate from the Civic Platform list. From 2011 to 2012 she served as the Minister of National Education.

She was also a member of Sejm 2001-2005.

See also
Members of Polish Sejm 2005-2007

External links
Krystyna Szumilas - parliamentary page - includes declarations of interest, voting record, and transcripts of speeches.

1956 births
Living people
People from Knurów
Civic Platform politicians
Freedom Union (Poland) politicians
Members of the Polish Sejm 2001–2005
Members of the Polish Sejm 2005–2007
Members of the Polish Sejm 2007–2011
Members of the Polish Sejm 2011–2015
Members of the Polish Sejm 2015–2019
Members of the Polish Sejm 2019–2023
Women members of the Sejm of the Republic of Poland
Education ministers of Poland
Women government ministers of Poland
21st-century Polish women politicians
University of Silesia in Katowice alumni
Polish city councillors